Kingston Avenue Hospital for Contagious Diseases opened in 1891 as f; patients were transferred to Kings County Hospital Center in 1955.

History
A 'special pavilion' was established at the hospital during a period of cases of infantile paralysis that included eleven deaths in Brooklyn. It was used to take in cases where infected children were identified by the health commissioner.

Controversies
A mother claimed that it took going to court to "free" her child from the hospital after "alleging neglect." Twenty-two years later the removal of Kingston's Medical Superintendent became a public matter.

References

External links
 1930 census. Institution(s): Kingston Avenue Hospital

  

Defunct hospitals in Brooklyn